Heliorestis daurensis is an alkaliphilic and rod-shaped bacterium from the genus of Heliorestis which has been isolated from a soda lake from Siberia.

References

Eubacteriales
Bacteria described in 2000